Dico Chezarino Joey Jap Tjong, known as Dico Jap Tjong (born 15 November 1998) is a Dutch professional footballer.

Club career
He made his Eerste Divisie debut for Roda JC Kerkrade on 14 October 2018 in a game against Go Ahead Eagles as an 85th-minute substitute for Nicky Souren.

In August 2020, Tjong moved to FC Eindhoven.

Personal life
Born in the Netherlands, Jap Tjong is of Surinamese descent.

References

External links
 

1998 births
Footballers from Amsterdam
Living people
Dutch footballers
Dutch expatriate footballers
Association football midfielders
ASV De Dijk players
AFC DWS players
K.V.C. Westerlo players
K.V. Mechelen players
K.R.C. Genk players
Roda JC Kerkrade players
Oud-Heverlee Leuven players
FC Eindhoven players
Eerste Divisie players
Challenger Pro League players
Dutch expatriate sportspeople in Belgium
Expatriate footballers in Belgium
AVV Swift players